"You Wear It Well" is a song recorded by DeBarge for the Gordy label. It was released as the third single off their fourth album, Rhythm of the Night; the single release was credited to "El DeBarge with DeBarge."

The song eventually reached number 7 on the Billboard R&B chart, number 47 on the Billboard Hot 100 chart. "You Wear It Well" also spent two weeks atop the Billboard Hot Dance Club Play chart in October and November 1985.  El DeBarge made a guest appearance on the NBC sitcom The Facts of Life on November 2, 1985, at the same time the single was released and performed it with the show's principal stars, Lisa Whelchel, Kim Fields, Mindy Cohn, and Nancy McKeon, who provided backup vocals. El also performed the song on the "Bought and Paid For" episode of Miami Vice, which aired three weeks later.

Charts

Credits 
 El DeBarge – lead and backing vocals, keyboards, synthesizer programming, drums, percussion 
 Paul Fox – synthesizer programming
 Jesse Johnson – guitars 
 Tommy DeBarge – bass 
 Mark DeBarge – percussion 
 Jim Gilstrap – backing vocals 
 Bunny Hill – backing vocals
Remix versions done by - John Morales and Sergio Munzibai

Official Versions
Album Version - 4:45
Short Version - 3:54 (only heard on the "Ultimate Collection", "20th Century Masters - The Millennium Collection: The Best Of DeBarge" and "Definitive Collection" albums)
M&M Club Mix - 6:53
M&M Dub Mix - 5:20

See also
List of number-one dance singles of 1985 (U.S.)

References

1985 singles
DeBarge songs
Songs written by El DeBarge
1985 songs
Gordy Records singles